R53 may refer to:
 R53 (South Africa), a road
 , a destroyer of the Royal Navy
 Junkers R53, a transport aircraft
 Mini Hatch (R53), a car
 Nissan Pathfinder (R53), a sport utility vehicle
 R53: May cause long-term adverse effects in the aquatic environment, a risk phrase
 Tachihi R-53, a training aircraft